Bettles Bay State Marine Park is a 679-acre (275 ha) undeveloped Alaska state marine park. There is no road access to the park. The park can be accessed from the lagoon northeast of the islands. The park offers great views of Bettles Glacier. Attractions include an old stamp press and gold mine, just southeast of the park.

Activities include wildlife viewing, boating, and fishing. Although there are campsites, camping is poor due to wetlands.

There are many habitats within the park including estuaries, eelgrass beds, salmon spawning, waterfowl nesting, and sea otter habitats.

See also 

 List of Alaska state parks

External links

References

State parks of Alaska